

Paul Leppin (27 November 1878, Prague (Prag, Praha), Royal Bohemia, Imp.&R.Austria  10 April 1945, Prague, Bohemia, Bohemia & Moravia/3rd Czechoslovakia) was a 20th-century Bohemian writer of German language, who was born and lived in Prague.

Although he wrote in German, he was in close contact with Czech literature. He translated Czech books and wrote articles on Czech literature.

Work 
 Die Türe des Lebens, (The Doors of Life) 1901
 Severins Gang in die Finsternis, (Severin's Journey into the Dark) 1914
 Das Paradies der Anderen, (Others' Paradise) 1922
 Daniel Jesus, 1905
 Blaugast, posthumously

English translations 
 Blaugast: A Novel of Decline, translated from the German by Cynthia Klima, Prague, Twisted Spoon Press, 2007, 
 Severin's journey into the dark, translated from the German by Kevin Blahut, Prague, Twisted Spoon Press, 1993, 
 Others' paradise, translated from the German by Stephanie Howard and Amy R. Nestor, Prague, Twisted Spoon Press, 1995, 2003,

See also

External links 

 Biographical and bibliographical information
 
 Paul Leppin at Twisted Spoon Press
 Severin's Journey into the Dark (Twisted Spoon Press)
 Others' Paradise (Twisted Spoon Press)
 Blaugast (Twisted Spoon Press)
 

1878 births
1945 deaths
19th-century Czech people
19th-century Austrian people
20th-century Czech people
Czech novelists
Czech male novelists
Czech writers in German
German Bohemian people
Czechoslovak civilians killed in World War II
People from the Kingdom of Bohemia
Writers from Prague
Austro-Hungarian writers